The First American Road in Florida (also known as the Andrew Jackson Trail or Military Road) is a historic road near Gulf Breeze, Florida. It is located in the Naval Live Oaks Area of the Gulf Islands National Seashore.

History 
After the Adams–Onís Treaty went into effect in 1821, Pensacola, along with the rest of the Florida Territory was officially transferred from Spain to the United States. In 1824, the US Congress provided funding to build the Pensacola-St. Augustine Road, known as Bellamy Road, in order to connect East Florida with West Florida. On September 28, 1998, the Andrew Jackson Trail was added to the National Register of Historic Places.

See also 
 Bellamy Road

References

External links
 Santa Rosa County listings at National Register of Historic Places
 Florida's Office of Cultural and Historical Programs
 Santa Rosa County markers
 First American Road in Florida

Roads on the National Register of Historic Places in Florida
National Register of Historic Places in Santa Rosa County, Florida
Roads in Santa Rosa County, Florida